Wheelman, wheel-men, or variation, may refer to:

People
 Wheelman (driver), a person who drives an automobile, especially for a getaway
 Cyclist (bicyclist), referred to as wheelmen in the 19th century
 Wiilman, an indigenous Australian tribe of Western Australia, sometimes referred to as "Wheelman"

Fictional characters
 "Wheelman", the player character in the Driver (series) videogame series
 Wheelmen, a character class in the TV show Machine Robo: Battle Hackers
 Wheelmen, a character class from the TV show Machine Robo: Revenge of Cronos
 Wheelman, a fictional character from the E.E. "Doc" Smith novel Galactic Patrol (novel)

Arts, entertainment, and media
 Wheelman (film), a 2017 action thriller film
 Wheelman (video game), a 2009 driving video game
 "Wheelman" (TV episode), a 1985 episode of Dempsey and Makepeace
 "Wheel Man" (TV episode), a 1993 episode of Renegade
 The Wheel Man (album), 2007 album by Watermelon Slim

Literature
 Outing (magazine) (1882-1923), formerly called Wheelman in the 19th century
 Wheelmen, a 2013 a book about American cycling
 "The Wheel Man", a story by James Benson Nablo; the basis of the 1954 film Drive a Crooked Road

Other uses
 Wheelman, a penny-farthing bicycle manufactured by Coker Tire

See also

 
 Cycling, the use of bicycles for transport, recreation, exercise or sport
 Helmsman, a person who steers a ship, sailboat, submarine, other type of maritime vessel, or spacecraft